In mathematics — specifically, in geometric measure theory — spherical measure σn is the "natural" Borel measure on the n-sphere Sn.  Spherical measure is often normalized so that it is a probability measure on the sphere, i.e. so that σn(Sn) = 1.

Definition of spherical measure

There are several ways to define spherical measure.  One way is to use the usual "round" or "arclength" metric ρn on Sn;  that is, for points x and y in Sn, ρn(x, y) is defined to be the (Euclidean) angle that they subtend at the centre of the sphere (the origin of Rn+1).  Now construct n-dimensional Hausdorff measure Hn on the metric space (Sn, ρn) and define

One could also have given Sn the metric that it inherits as a subspace of the Euclidean space Rn+1;  the same spherical measure results from this choice of metric.

Another method uses Lebesgue measure λn+1 on the ambient Euclidean space Rn+1:  for any measurable subset A of Sn, define σn(A) to be the (n + 1)-dimensional volume of the "wedge" in the ball Bn+1 that it subtends at the origin.  That is,

where

The fact that all these methods define the same measure on Sn follows from an elegant result of Christensen:  all these measures are obviously uniformly distributed on Sn, and any two uniformly distributed Borel regular measures on a separable metric space must be constant (positive) multiples of one another.  Since all our candidate σn's have been normalized to be probability measures, they are all the same measure.

Relationship with other measures

The relationship of spherical measure to Hausdorff measure on the sphere and Lebesgue measure on the ambient space has already been discussed.

Spherical measure has a nice relationship to Haar measure on the orthogonal group.  Let O(n) denote the orthogonal group acting on Rn and let θn denote its normalized Haar measure (so that θn(O(n)) = 1).  The orthogonal group also acts on the sphere Sn−1.  Then, for any x ∈ Sn−1 and any A ⊆ Sn−1,

In the case that Sn is a topological group (that is, when n is 0, 1 or 3), spherical measure σn coincides with (normalized) Haar measure on Sn.

Isoperimetric inequality

There is an isoperimetric inequality for the sphere with its usual metric and spherical measure (see Ledoux & Talagrand, chapter 1):

If A ⊆ Sn−1 is any Borel set and B⊆ Sn−1 is a ρn-ball with the same σn-measure as A, then, for any r > 0,

where Ar denotes the "inflation" of A by r, i.e.

In particular, if σn(A) ≥  and n ≥ 2, then

References

  
   (See chapter 1)
   (See chapter 3)

Measures (measure theory)